John Wilson FRS (11 December 1804 – 1 December 1875) was a Scottish Christian missionary, orientalist and educator in the Bombay presidency, British India.

In 1828, he married Margaret Bayne and together they went as Christian missionaries of the Scottish Missionary Society to Bombay, India, arriving on 13 February 1829. He is the founder of Wilson College, Mumbai and one of the founders of Bombay University, along with the Hon. Jugonnath Sunkersett and Dr. Bhau Daji Lad. He was also the president of the Asiatic Society of Bombay from 1835 to 1842; and was elected Moderator of the Free Church of Scotland in 1870.

Early life and studies
John Wilson was born in Lauder on 11 December 1804, the eldest of four brothers and three sisters, and grew up in a farming family. His father, Andrew Wilson, who lived to the age of eighty-two, was a councillor of the burgh for over forty years and represented the parish church as an elder. John's mother, Janet Hunter, was the oldest of thirteen children; she had a strong character and also lived to the age of eighty-two.  The family grew up in Lauder on a hill farm sprawled across seventeen hundred acres.

As a child Wilson revealed that he was more intelligent than his siblings, learning to walk and talk at an early age.  In school he was considered 'the priest' on the playground because was often seen preaching to his classmates.  His being advanced for his age sometimes caused him trouble, and his preaching was sometimes seen as an offence.

When Wilson was four, he started at a school in Lauder, taught by a George Murray.  He was only there for a year before he was moved to a parish school to be taught by Alexander Paterson. He left school at the age of fourteen, the standard end of school in Scotland in the 19th century.  His progress was also in his spiritual life.  Mr. Paterson affected not only his students' spiritually but also the community.

From 1819 he attended the University of Edinburgh, where he studied linguistics, philosophy and theology for eight years, and also mastered the languages of Gujarati, Hebrew, Greek, Latin, Urdu, Hindi, Persian, Arabic and Zend. As he continued in his studies he discovered that teaching was a calling for him, and started to study in that field. He graduated from the University in 1828.

Wilson's first experience of teaching was as a guide and tutor to the three boys of Colonel Rose Cormack.  As he guided them through the Netherlands he tutored them.  These young men went on to be successful, one becoming Sir John Rose Cormack, a physician in Paris.  After touring for four years with the Cormack boys and studying at the University of Edinburgh during the same period he decided to dedicate his life to the people of India, specifically the people of Bombay in the education field.

Educational mission

In 1829, a year after his graduation, Wilson and his wife went to Bombay as Christian missionaries supported by the Church of Scotland. The couple first studied Marathi at Harnai; then in 1831 they moved back to Bombay, where John established the Ambroli Church for the people.

During 1830-1831, Wilson engaged in debates with Hindu apologists in Bombay. In 1830, his protege Ram Chandra, a Hindu convert to Christianity, debated with several Hindu Brahmin apologists in public. In 1831, Wilson himself debated with the Hindu pandit Morobhatt Dandekar, who summarized his arguments in a Marathi-language work titled Shri-Hindu-dharma-sthapana. Wilson translated Dandekar's text into English, and responded to it in his An Exposure of the Hindu Religion. Narayan Rao of Satara responded to Wilson's text in a pamphlet edited by Dandekar, and Wilson repsonded to it with A Second Exposure of the Hindoo Religion (1834).

Determined to set up educational institutions for the young in Bombay, John first established an English school in 1832, and added a college in 1836 – now called Wilson College, Mumbai.  With this school John was able to introduce European education, examinations and textbooks to the people of the city.  This would gradually change the way in which schools in Bombay orchestrated themselves. In 1857 John helped to establish the Bombay University, and went on to become its Vice-Chancellor in 1869.

Wilson's wife, Margaret, also influenced the education system in Bombay, and aided the female population by establishing schools for girls in 1829.  In 1832 she established a boarding school for females, now called St. Columba High School. This was western India's first boarding school for females.

The couple also opened schools in Marathi and Hebrew for the Native Jewish community of the Bene Israel of the Konkan region, teaching Boys as well as girls and translating the Holy Bible especially the Old Testament for their benefit.

Wilson was a passionate advocate for the preservation of Indian historical monuments. He was the Honorary President of what was then the Asiatic Society of Bombay. When the Bombay Cave Temple Commission was established in 1848, he was elected the first president.  He was an important lobbyist for the establishment in 1861 of the Archaeological Survey of India.

Family

He married:
(1)  12 August 1828,  Margaret,  author of Account of the Ancient Egyptians  [in Marathi]  (Bombay 1839)  (died 19th April 1835),  daughter of Kenneth Bayne,  minister of the Gaelic Parish,  Greenock,  and had issue. Following Margaret's death her sisters, Anna and Hay Bayne, joined Wilson in India as housekeepers and companions.
Andrew,  Oriental traveller,  editor of the Times of India,  author of The Abode of Snow  (1875)  and other works,  born 1831, died at Howton on Ullswater 9 June 1881
(2)  September 1846,  Isabella  (died s.p.  September 1867),  second daughter of James Dennistoun of Dennistoun. She died in 1867 and he was then joined in India by her niece, Miss Taylor.

Writings
Wilson was the author of many books.  Early in his mission he started a periodical about religion, society, culture and European thought, called The Oriental Christian Spectator, which ran from 1830 to 1862.  In 1838 he wrote A Memoir of Mrs. Margret Wilson, and in 1850 a Memoir of the Cave Temples and Monasteries and Ancient Remains in Western India.  In 1858 he wrote, India Three Thousand Years Ago. As the years went on he wrote many books, including Parsi Religion (1843), Evangelisation of India (1849), History of the Suppression of Female Infanticide in Western India (1855), Aboriginal Tribes of The Bombay Presidency (1876) and Indian Caste (1877).

As an archaeologist, Wilson wrote the 1847 Lands of the Bible: Visited and Described, the 1861 Caves of Karla (on the Karla Caves), and the 1875 Religious Excavations of Western India: Buddhist, Brahamanical and Jaina. He also published a small account about the origins of the Bene Israel Jewish community of the Konkan region in 1838.

Encouragement to Active Missionary Exertions  [anon.] (Edinburgh,  1827)
The Life of John Eliot, Apostle of the Indians  [anon.]  (Edinburgh, 1828)
An Exposure of the Hindu Religion (Bombay,  1832)
A Second Exposure of the Hindu Religion  (Bombay,  1834)
Missionary Journey in Gujrat and Cutch  (Bombay, 1838)
Memoir of Mrs Margaret Wilson (Edinburgh,  1838,  1840,  1858,  1860)
Idiomatical Exercises illustrative of the English and Marathi Languages  (Bombay,  1839)
The Parsi Religion  .  .  .  unfolded,  refuted,  and contrasted with Christianity  (Bombay, 1843)
The Doctrine of Jehovah,  addressed to the Parsis  (Bombay,  1847)
The Lands of the Bible Visited,  2 vols.  (Edinburgh, 1847)
The Evangelisation of India  (Edinburgh, 1849)
"A Memoir on the Cave Temples and Monasteries,  and other Buddhist,  Brahmanical,  and Jaine Remains of Western India"  (Journ. Bombay Asiatic Soc,  iii.,  reprinted in 1850)
Darkness and Dawn in India  (Bombay,  1853)
History of the Suppression of Infanticide in Western India  (Bombay,  1855)
Sermon at the Baptism of a  Parsi Youth  (Bombay,  1856)
India Three Thousand Years Ago  (Bombay,  1858)
Assembly Addresses  (Edinburgh, 1870)
A Poetical Address to India  (Bombay, 1872)
Indian Caste  [edited by Peter Paterson],2 vols  (Bombay,  1877,  Edinburgh, 1878)
Hazer and Hazor in the Scriptures (n.d.).

He founded the Oriental Christian Spectator,  1830.  Contributed articles to the Bombay Quarterly Review,  British and Foreign Evangelical Review,  and North British Review.

References

Citations

Sources

David, M. D. John Wilson and his Institution. Wilson College, Bombay: John Wilson Education Society, 1975.

Wilson, John. History of the Suppression Of Infanticide in Western India Under the Government of Bombay.  Bombay: American Mission Press, 1855.
Wilson, John. Indian Caste.  Bombay: Times of India Office, William Blackwood & Sons, 1877.
Wilson, John. A Memoir of Mrs. Margaret Wilson. Bombay: William Whyte & Co, 1838.
Wilson, John. Parsi Religion.  Bombay: American Mission Press, 1843.

External Works

Scottish Presbyterian missionaries
Presbyterian missionaries in India
1875 deaths
1804 births
University of Mumbai people
British people in colonial India
Alumni of the University of Edinburgh
Scottish expatriates in India
Scottish educators
Scottish educational theorists
Founders of Indian schools and colleges
University and college founders
Church of Scotland
Missionary educators
Scottish people of the British Empire
Scottish founders
19th-century Ministers of the Free Church of Scotland
19th-century Scottish writers